Chondropoma crenulatum (ex Diplopoma crenulatum) is a species of operculate land snail, terrestrial gastropod mollusk gastropod in the family Pomatiidae.

Distribution
Distribution of Chondropoma crenulatum include:
 Saint Barthélemy.
 Saint Martin
 Antigua
 Barbuda
 Guadeloupe
 Petite Terre 
 Marie-Galante
 La Désirade
 Martinica

Shells of Chondropoma sp. were also collected in Dominica.

References

Pomatiidae
Gastropods described in 1835